This is a list of programs broadcast by the American television channel NBCSN, which includes its eras as the Outdoor Life Network (OLN) and Versus (VS.).

3-Gun Nation
36
Aaron's Outdoors
All of the Best Whitetail Tips
American Drag Racing League
American Ninja Warrior
Americana Outdoors
Ammo & Attitude
AMSOIL Championship Snocross
Armstrong
Ask Bobke
Atlanta Football Classic
Babe Winkelman: Outdoor Secrets
Babe Winkelman's Good Fishing
Back County Quest
Bass 2 Billfish
The Bass Pros
Behind the Bike with Austin Caroll
Beretta's Bird Hunter's Journal
Beretta's Waterfowler's Edge
The Best and Worst of Tred Barta
Big Bass Battle
Bill Dance Outdoors
Blue Collar Adventures
Bob Izumi's Real Fishing
Bob Redfern's Outdoor Magazine
Bobke's Beef
The Bucks of Tecomate
Cabela's Master Walleye Circuit
Camo Life
Campbell Outdoor Challenge
Charlie Moore: No Offense
City Limits Fishing with Mike Iaconelli
The Coaches Corner
College Football Talk
Collegiate Bass Championship
Contador
Costas Tonight
Criterium de Dauphine
Critérium International
The Crossover
Curling Night in America
D U's WaterDog
The Daily Line
The Daily Line Interview
Dakar Rally
Danica's Decade
The Dan Patrick Show
Deer and Deer Hunting TV
Deer Gear
Dirt Knight
/DRIVE
Elk Fever
Eye of the Hunter
F1 Extra
Fanarchy
Fantasy Football Live
Federal Premium Damage Game
Fish the Baja
Fishing with Roland Martin
FLW Outdoors
Fly Fish TV with Kelly Galloup
Formula D
Formula One (from 2013 to 2017, 16 races)
George Poveromo's World of Saltwater Fishing
Global Pursuit Safari
Goin' Country with Kristy Lee Cook
GP2 Series
Great American Outdoor Trail's Radio Magazine
Greatest MLB Rivalries
Grid
Gun It with Benny Spies
Gun Talk
Guns & Gear
Hank Parker 3D
Hank Parker's Outdoor Magazine
Hook 'N Look with Kim Stricker
Hunt For Big Fish
Huntin' with the Judge
Ice Men
Indianapolis 500 - Carb Day
Indy Lights
Inside the Daily Line
Inside Israeli Basketball
InterBike 2010
Into the Blue
Intrepid Outdoors: Guns vs. Bows
Jenny from the Blog
Jimmy Houston Outdoors
Kicker Big Air Bash
La Flèche Wallonne
The Lance Chronicles
Liege Bastogne Liege
The 'Lights
Lindner's Angling Edge
Lucas Oil Pro Motocross Championship
Lucas Oil Motorsports Hour
Majesty Outdoors
MLS on NBC
Match of the Day
Mountain West Basketball
Napa's North to Alaska
NASCAR America
NASCAR Whelen Modified Tour
National Lacrosse League
NBA D-League
NBC SportsTalk
The Next Bite
NHL Draft Lottery
The NHL Guardians
NHL on NBC
Non-Stop Hunting
North American Fisherman
North American Hunter
The Numbers Guys
One More Cast with Shaw Grigsby
O'Neill Outside
OPA Offshore Racing Series
Outdoor Edge's Love of the Hunt
Pacific Expeditions
Paris–Nice
Paris Roubaix
Poker2Nite
Primal Adventures TV
Pro Football Talk
Quest for the One
Racer TV
Razor Dobbs Alive
Real Hunting
Remington's The Buck Stops Here with Mike Hanback
The Rider Insider
The Robin Hood Rally
The Roadside Tour
Ruger's Adventures
Safari Hunter's Journal
Saltwater Experience
Saturday Night Live
Scent Blocker Most Wanted
Schleck
Scott Martin Challenge
Seasons on the Fly
Sepang 1000 km
Shark Hunters
SHOT Show
Sport Fishing TV
Sports Hangover
Sports Jeopardy!
Sports Jobs with Junior Seau
Sports Soup
SportsDash with Yahoo Sports
Steve Scott's Outdoor Guide
Super Retriever Series
The T. Ocho After Show
The T. Ocho Show
Testosterone Theater
This Week in Indy Racing with Lindy Thackston
Title Talk
Tour de France
Tour de Romandie
Tour de Suisse
Tour Down Under
Tour of California
Tour of Flanders
U.S. Ski and Snowboarding Events
UFC on Versus
UFC Primetime
Ultimate Diver Challenge
Under Wild Skies
United Football League
USA Beach Volleyball
USA Diving Nationals
USA Judo
USA Triathlon
USA Waterpolo Exhibition Series
Verizon IndyCar Series
Versus Archive
Viewers' Choice
VS Whitetail Challenge
Whacked Out Sports
Wheel Sucking with Neil Browne
Winchester Legends
Winchester Turkey Revolution
Winchester Whitetail Revolution
Winchester World of Whitetail with Larry Weishuhn
Winning with Johan
World Bicycle Relief
World Challenge
World Chase Tag
The World of Beretta
World Series of Boxing
World's Best 10K
WTA Sony Ericsson
XDL Sportbike Championship
Yamaha Whitetail Diaries

See also
NBCSN
NBC Sports
OLN, current Canadian Outdoor Living Network
List of programs broadcast by OLN

References

External links
NBC Sports website

NBCSN